Tianya Haijiao is a popular visitor attraction  west of Sanya city, Hainan, China.

The venue is considered the southernmost point of China's land area despite the fact that Jinmu Cape actually is. It is for this reason that it is a popular sightseeing destination for tourists, as well as the fact that, on clear days, various islets are visible.

In Chinese literature, the cape is mentioned in many famous poems, such as "I will follow you to Tian-Ya-Hai-Jiao", which means the couple will never be separated.  Therefore, many newlyweds spend part of their honeymoon visiting the place.

Popular tourist attractions
The Rocks of Sun and Moon are two boulders near hundreds of other uniquely shaped rocks.  Here the "Sun" refers to "husband" and the "Moon" refers to "wife".  Looking from the distance, they resemble a couple entwined to each other but they are in fact separate rocks.
Southern Heaven Rock, a boulder near the Rock of Sun and Moon, with a famous poem of Fan Yun-Ti inscribed on its top.
 Tian-Ya Cliff, with an inscription by Cheng Zhe on the top.
 Pre-Historic Shell Museum

References

External links

Hainan Government Travel portal , the English site is currently under construction.
 Government Travel instructions 
 Information for Travellers 
 Hainan Island Blog 

Resorts in China
Tourist attractions in Sanya